The Cloister of Martins is a 1951 West German drama film directed by Richard Häussler and starring Willy Rösner, Gisela Fackeldey and Heinz Engelmann. It is based on the novel of the same title by Ludwig Ganghofer. The film is part of the postwar tradition of heimatfilm in German cinema. It was shot at the Bavaria Studios in Munich and on location around Königssee and Karwendel in the Alps. The film's sets were designed by the art directors Willi Horn and Carl Ludwig Kirmse.

Cast
 Willy Rösner as Waze, Verweser im Gadener Land
 Gisela Fackeldey as Recka
 Heinz Engelmann as Eberwein, Propst von Berchtesgaden
 Paul Richter as Sigenot, der Fischer
 Ingeborg Cornelius as Edelrot
 Ferdinand Anton as Ruedlieb Schönauer
 Sepp Nigg as Wambo
 Walter Janssen as Waldram
 Hubert Kiurina as Henning
 Alf Eder as Sindel
 Armin Dahlen as Rimiger
 Uli Steigberg as Hartwig
 Richard Passavant as Eilbert
 Richard Wagner as Gerold
 Hans Terofal as Otloh
 Karl Tischlinger
 Elise Aulinger as Ulla, eine Magd
 Viktor Gehring as Schönauer, Richtmann im Gaden
 Michl Lang as Wicho, der Knecht
 Viktor Afritsch
 Rolf Pinegger as Eigel, der Köhler
 Bertl Schultes
 Hans Nützels
 Rolf Straub as Domin
 H. Wesenbeck as Schweiker

References

Bibliography 
 Goble, Alan. The Complete Index to Literary Sources in Film. Walter de Gruyter, 1999.

External links 
 

1951 films
West German films
1950s German-language films
Films based on works by Ludwig Ganghofer
Films directed by Richard Häussler
Films set in the 12th century
Films set in the Holy Roman Empire
Films set in the Alps
German historical drama films
1950s historical drama films
1951 drama films
German black-and-white films
1950s German films
Films shot at Bavaria Studios